The Ljubljana Opera House (or ) is an opera house in Ljubljana, the capital of Slovenia. The seat of the national opera and ballet company, the Ljubljana Slovene National Theatre Opera and Ballet, it serves as the national opera building of the country. It stands at 1 Župančič Street between the Slovenian Parliament building, on one hand, and the National Museum and the National Gallery, on the other hand.

History
The building was originally named the Provincial Theatre and was built between 1890 and 1892 in the Neo-Renaissance style by the Czech architects Jan Vladimír Hráský and Anton Hruby. Before the construction of the German Theatre (the present Ljubljana National Drama Theatre (SNG) at 1 Erjavec Street) in 1911, the building served as a venue for productions in both Slovene and German, and afterwards only in Slovene.

Architecture
The facade of the Opera House has Ionic columns supporting a pediment with a tympanum above the entrance and has two niches at the side adorned with allegorical statues of Tragedy and Comedy by the sculptor  (1859–1935).

Gallery

References

Opera and Ballet Theatre
Opera houses in Slovenia
Music venues completed in 1892
Opera and Ballet Theatre
Opera and Ballet Theatre
Jan Vladimír Hráský buildings
Theatres completed in 1892